In mathematics, Hall's theorem may refer to:

 Hall's marriage theorem
 One of several theorems about Hall subgroups